Wudian is a town under the administration of Zaoyang City in northern Hubei province, China, located  south of downtown Zaoyang and just south of G70 Fuzhou–Yinchuan Expressway. , it has 2 residential communities and 44 villages under its administration.

Administrative divisions
Communities:
Zhongxin, Qingtan

Villages:
Xinzhuang, Chunling, Yaogang, Xizhaohu, Shengmiao, Erlang, Xiaowan, Zhouzhai, Huangmiao, Dongzhaohu, Shutou, Gunhe, Lizhai, Tongxin, Huangcun, Shilou, Wukou, Shenfan, Baima, Gaofeng, Dazi, Xulou, Baishui, Tiantai, Liangshui, Tangwan, Chaijiamiao, Dongchong, Jiangfan, Yuzui, Shuangcaomen, Sanligang, Xuzhai, Chengwan, Shuangwan, Jingwan, Qiganwan, Changligang, Dayanjiao, Yuhuangmiao, Hewan, Huawuji, Shici, Yufan

See also 
 List of township-level divisions of Hubei

References 

Township-level divisions of Hubei